Aus is a surname. Notable people with the surname include:

 Gunvald Aus (1851–1950), Norwegian-American engineer
 Lauri Aus (1970–2003), Estonian cyclist
  (born 1976), Estonian artist, art researcher and pedagogue 

Estonian-language surnames